Greenvale Brook is a watercourse in Greater Manchester and a tributary of the River Roch.

Tributaries

Lydgate Brook
Castle Brook
Red Brook
Lead Mine Brook

Rivers of the Metropolitan Borough of Rochdale
1